Arbia may refer to:

 Arbia (river), a torrent in Tuscany, central Italy, a tributary of the river Ombrone
 Arbia, Asciano, a town in Tuscany, central Italy, administratively a frazione of the comune of Asciano, province of Siena